Ainlay is a surname. Notable people with the surname include:

Chuck Ainlay, record producer
Harry Dean Ainlay (1887–1970), Canadian educator and politician
Harry Ainlay Composite High School, Canadian high school located in Edmonton, Alberta, Canada
Stephen Ainlay, American college president